Phyllonorycter triplacomis is a moth of the family Gracillariidae. It is known from Taiwan.

The larvae feed on Photinia lucida and Photinia taiwanensis. They probably mine the leaves of their host plant.

References

triplacomis
Moths of Asia
Moths described in 1936